(born October 4, 1989 as Park Rihwa (Korean: 박리화; Kanji: 朴梨華; Japanese: パク・リファ Paku Rifa) is a Japanese pop singer. She is represented by Toy's Factory and managed by Amuse, Inc.

Biography
Rihwa was born and raised in Sapporo until she graduated junior high school. She is considered to be Zainichi Korean. She then went on to study overseas in Belleville, Ontario for her high school education. She returned to Japan in 2009 after she graduated. She started her career as a singer by releasing her first of three singles entitled 'Private' on May 18, 2010 In January 2012 Rihwa release her first album "private #0" and moved to Tokyo to launch her career.

On April 20, 2012 it was announced that Rihwa had been signed to major label Toy's Factory. She then made her major label debut with the single 'CHANGE'.

Discography

Singles

Albums

References

External links
 
 Official Blog
 Learn To Fly – Previous Bog
 Amuse Inc.'s Profile Page
 Toy's Factory Profile Page

1989 births
Living people
J-pop singers
Musicians from Sapporo
Amuse Inc. talents
21st-century Japanese women singers
21st-century Japanese singers
Zainichi Korean people